India's Best Dancer 1 is the first season of the Indian reality TV series India's Best Dancer. It premiered on 29 February 2020 on Sony Entertainment Television and Sony Entertainment Television Asia. This season was hosted by Haarsh Limbachiyaa and Bharti Singh. The Grand Finale was aired on 22 November 2020 and winner was Tiger Pop.

Top 13 Contestants

Episodes

Scoring Chart

Guests
 Special Appearance states that the guest didn't come for any promotion or the episode didn't have any theme.

References

External links 

 India's Best Dancer on Sony Liv

India's Best Dancer seasons
2020 Indian television seasons